Frank Johannesen (born July 8, 1959) is a Norwegian sprint canoer who competed in the mid-1980s. He was eliminated in the semifinals of the K-4 1000 m event at the 1984 Summer Olympics in Los Angeles.

References

1959 births
Canoeists at the 1984 Summer Olympics
Living people
Norwegian male canoeists
Olympic canoeists of Norway